Sheryl Sheinafia Tjokro or professionally known as Sheryl Sheinafia is an Indonesian singer-songwriter, producer, actress and former TV show co-host most known for her hit song ‘Kutunggu Kau Putus’ and appearance on NET TV’s .

Following the commercial success of her debut album, she was selected as a co-host for a music show called “Breakout” on NET TV in 2014. This proved to be a quintessential role that expanded Sheryl’s career both as a media presence and presenter without disregarding her passion for music.

From hosting music centric TV shows to having her songs featured on movie soundtracks, music has been at the center of Sheryl’s career advances. Albeit being a trailblazer for having a career across multiple industries, the recently independent artist’s identity as a musician is her most notable persona.

Aside from commercial success, her music proves to be critically acclaimed. Her hit single ‘Kutunggu Kau Putus’ in collaboration with Ariel (lead singer of the band NOAH), earned a nomination for best pop collaboration in the Anugerah Musik Indonesia Awards. She ended up winning in a similar category (best duo/group/group performance/collaboration in R&B and Soul) 2 years later with her single ‘I Don’t Mind’ in collaboration with Vidi Aldiano and Jevin Julian.

Her acting career is nothing short of outstanding, landing several leading roles in an array of films across different genres;  Koala Kumal (2016), Galih & Ratna (2017), Bebas (2019), Wedding Proposal (2021) and her most recent horror hit, Tumbang Kanjeng Iblis (2022). Excellence proves to be a consistent theme throughout Sheryl’s career as she continues to perform across the board. In 2016 she received the title “Breakthrough Actress of the Year" for her performance in Koala Kumal (2016) and 5 years later followed up with winning “Best Actress in a Comedy Film” for her performance in Wedding Proposal (2021).

Early Life & Musical Career

Born on December 4, 1996, Sheryl Sheinafia kicked off her career as a musician in 2009, later releasing a self-titled debut album under music label Musica Studios in 2013. Despite it being Sheryl’s first project, the album met commercial success, producing chart-topping hits such as ‘Rasa Sunyi’. Her sophomore album ‘ii’ proved to be even more successful, solidifying her position as a household name both in Musica’s catalog and in the Indonesian pop scene. The album  is home to two of Sheryl's biggest Indonesian hits, ‘Kutunggu Kau Putus’ and ‘Kedua Kalinya’, with the latter of the two used as a soundtrack for one of Indonesia’s biggest comedy films, Raditya Dika’s Koala Kumal (2016).

Due to a flourishing acting career and landing subsequent leading roles in numerous high profile films, Sheryl would not release another album for the next 4 years. Unable to take a hiatus from music, she instead diverted her focus into releasing singles to strengthen her discography. In 2017, she released her self-written hit ‘Sweet Talk’ produced by Tushar Apte, whose discography includes producing for world renowned artists such as Chris Brown, BTS, Demi Lovato and many others. Surpassing the success of ‘Kutunggu Kau Putus’, ‘Sweet Talk’ became the biggest release of her career. Alongside winning “Best Collaborative Work”  at the AMI Awards, its music video also won "Best Music Video of The Year" at the SCTV 2018 awards. The single also marks the start of a series of releases fully written in English, starting off with  ‘Fix You Up’ followed by ‘I Don’t Mind’ and ending with ‘Dream High’. Other than the critically acclaimed ‘I Don’t Mind’ collaboration, the trio also included ‘Dream High’, the official song for the 2018 Asian Paralympic Games.

In 2019, she released her single ‘Positif’, a cover of Naif’s ‘Posesif’ in collaboration with Danone-Aqua, as an effort to raise awareness on mindful plastic consumption and shine a spotlight on sustainability.

Looking to end her album hiatus in 2020, Sheryl traveled to the US to carry out a workshop to produce a 3-song EP under a partnership between Musica Studios and Empire Asia. Other than being an international collaboration between two big labels, the highlights of the project included having Grammy-nominated producer Tha Aristocrats producing the first single off the trilogy, “Want Ur Love”. However, due to the COVID-19 outbreak, the release of the project was delayed and postponed until further notice. Refusing to be discouraged, Sheryl would then go on to carry out her single rollout that eventually led up to release her third studio album under Musica and first album written fully in English, ‘Jennovine’, on January 15, 2021.

The concept for the album started with a dream Sheryl had as a 13-year old. She dreamt of childbirth but instead of giving birth to a child, she was met with a guitar, to which she named ‘Jennovine’. The album shows Sheryl coming to terms with maturity both as an adult but more importantly as a musician, letting go of the past and reliving childhood ambitions in an era of adulthood. ‘Jennovine’ is easily crowned her best pop project to date, exploring artistry and lyricism like never before. Embracing her collaborative spirit, the album features appearances from fellow Indonesian artists Ariel Nayaka, Rendy Pandugo and Pamungkas. Alongside direct features, Petra Sihombing and Gamaliel also bear producer credits.

Not long after ‘Jennovine’, the trilogy with Empire was picked up and mastered for release starting with ‘Want Ur Love’ at the end of 2021, followed by ‘Earn It’ and ‘Dedicate’ in early 2022. The EP became Sheryl’s last release under Musica before finally going independent in 2022.

Discography

Albums and EPs
 Sheryl Sheinafia (2013)
 ii (2017)
 Jennovine (2021)
 Want Ur Love Trilogy (2021)

Singles
 Drowning (2010)
 Demi Aku (2012)
 Rasa Sunyi (2013)
 Bla Bla Bla (2013)
 Kita Berdua (2014)
 Ku Tunggu Kau Putus (2017)
 Kedua Kalinya (2017)
 Gita Cinta (2017)
 Sebatas Teman (2017)
 Sweet Talk (2018)
 Fix You Up (2018)
 I Don't Mind (2018)
 Setia (2019)
 Positif (2019)
 Okay (2020)
 Bye (2020)
 I Wish I Knew Better (2020)
 Déjà vu (2020)
 Lose My Mind (2020)
 Want Ur Love (2021)
 Earn It (2022)
 Dedicate (2022)

Acting career

Before playing starring roles, Sheryl started her acting career with a cameo in Raditya Dika’s highly praised comedy film, Marmut Merah Jambu (2014). The part earned her a leading role in Dika’s sophomore film, Koala Kumal (2016) to which her performance in the film was critically acclaimed, earning her 3 nominations including one for "Best Newcomer"  from the Indonesian Movie Actors Awards. She then went on to play a leading role as Ratna alongside Refal Hady in Lucky Kuswandi’s modern take on classic Indonesian romantic drama, Galih & Ratna (2017). The role earned two nominations, including one for “Best Actress in a Leading Role”  from the Indonesian Film Festival and further solidified Sheryl’s acting career making her a serious talent to keep an eye out for in the Indonesian acting scene. In that same year, starring alongside Brandon Salim, Sheryl managed to secure another lead role as Ellie in The Underdogs (2017).

Her next big film would not be until 2 years later in which she played Kris in Bebas (2019), the Indonesian adaptation of the Korean film Sunny (2011). Directed by Riri Riza, the nostalgic tribute to highschool companionship was a box-office hit and soon after, racked numerous accolades during award season. She went on to star in another romantic comedy in 2021, playing Sissy in Wedding Proposal (2021) alongside other big names such as Dimas Anggara and Slamet Rahardjo.

Although known for her roles as Kris and Ratna, Sheryl’s range as an actress extends beyond playing roles in romcoms and dramas. In 2022 she starred in her first horror film, playing as Tia in Tumbang Kanjeng Iblis (2022). Despite it being her first horror film, her performance was nothing short of outstanding, with the film selling out theaters nationwide.

Media Presence
Although known for her career as a musician and actress, her appearance as a co-host on Breakout is notably the most well-known project. Also known as “Breakout Hangout”, “Breakout Showcase” and “Breakout Live”, “Breakout” is a music program that airs on NET TV. Starring alongside Boy William, Sheryl would often perform both covers and originals on the show.

After more than 4 years of taking a break from hosting her own show, she became one of the many hosts alongside famous MC and actor Dimas Danang for videocast Lintas Makna, produced by CXO media. Sheryl appeared in a total of 50 episodes, with topics of discussion ranging from intimate subjects such as love and relationships to talking about hustle culture and toxic work environments.

Brand Partnerships
Sheryl has also been the face of many brands, starting off with being a brand ambassador for skincare company Izzi in 2014. Continuing on the skincare journey, she would then go on to be a brand ambassador for Garnier the following year and Nivea in 2020.

In 2017, she became the face of ASUS whose partnership also sponsored Sheryl’s award-winning music video for ‘Sweet Talk’. In the subsequent year she became a brand ambassador for Adidas before becoming the face of Kapal Api to whom she also produced a jingle for in 2019. That same year, she partnered with Danone-Aqua to release a campaign on raising awareness on the importance of recycling and sustainable plastic consumption. Alongside partnerships with Kapal Api and Danone-Aqua, she was a brand ambassador for smartphone giant Vivo. In 2020, she became the main brand ambassador for yoghurt-drink Delicyo, who she also wrote and produced a jingle for.

Awards and nominations

References

External links 

Living people
1996 births
English-language singers from Indonesia
Indonesian child singers
21st-century Indonesian women singers
Indonesian pop singers
VJs (media personalities)